Haplometra cylindracea is a trematode parasite of frogs. Adult worms measure usually 10 mm and they are located in the lungs. H. cylindracea develops through 2 intermediate hosts: the first, a freshwater snail, the second, a  water beetle.

Morphology 
Adult worms are usually 10 mm long and they have elongate, cylindrical body. Ventral sucker is smaller than oral sucker. Eggs are dark brown in colour and measures 220 µm. Cercariae contains characteristic stylet.

Hosts 
Definitive hosts are frogs. H. cylindracea was documented in Rana temporaria, Rana esculenta, Rana ridibunda, Rana dalmatina, Rana arvalis, Bufo spp., Bombina spp.

First intermediate host is snail from family Lymnaeidae, i.e. Galba truncatula, Lymnaea palustris, Radix spp.

References 

Plagiorchiidae
Animals described in 1800
Parasites of molluscs
Parasites of insects
Parasites of amphibians